Hans Erik Ødegaard (born 20 January 1974) is a Norwegian former footballer who played as a central midfielder, and was assistant manager at Mjøndalen IF from 2009 to 2015. He is currently a head coach at Sandefjord.

Playing career
In his senior career, he played for Strømsgodset from 1993 to 2003 (making 241 league and cup appearances, scoring 52 goals), and Sandefjord from 2004 to 2006 (making 75 league and cup appearances, scoring 22 goals). He played for both clubs in the Tippeligaen and in the Norwegian First Division.

Career statistics

Coaching and management
After retiring, Ødegaard became the assistant manager for Mjøndalen IF in 2009, under manager Vegard Hansen.

They qualified for the promotion play-off tournament three times, finally winning promotion in 2014.

He became a Real Madrid youth coach on 22 January 2015, signing a three and a half-year contract as a youth coach when his son, Martin Ødegaard signed a contract with the club.
Hans Erik Ødegaard received an annual salary of 100,000 euros from Real Madrid for work with the children. In addition, the club secured him a premium of three million euros, according to the contract payable 30 days after signing. Converted to the contract equivalent to 957,143 euros per season. By comparison, Zinedine Zidane, who was head coach of Real Madrid's U23 at the time, cashed 600,000 euros a year for this job.

Managerial statistics

References

External links
Hans Erik Ødegaard at Alt om Fotball.

1974 births
Living people
Sportspeople from Drammen
Association football midfielders
Norwegian footballers
Norwegian Christians
Strømsgodset Toppfotball players
Sandefjord Fotball players
Eliteserien players
Norwegian First Division players
Norwegian football managers
Sandefjord Fotball managers
Eliteserien managers
Real Madrid CF non-playing staff